Daukantas Square in Vilnius, Lithuania  is located in the Old Town, in front of the Presidential Palace. Its name commemorates a progenitor of the 19th-century Lithuanian national revival, Simonas Daukantas. In the late 19th century it had a monument of Mikhail Nikolayevich Muravyov-Vilensky.

The square hosts state ceremonies. It has also been the site of demonstrations and rallies.

References

Squares in Vilnius